Philippe Gautier is the main author of a  "book [about] the history of the understanding of the technological, economic, legal and societal stakes or issues of the "Internet of Things". This book is actually an essay on the Future Internet and points out why the contributions of both sciences of complexity and cybernetics are necessary in the conception and realization of information systems to meet the new challenges of sensory technologies - such as NFC, RFID, Barcodes, GPS, etc. - and fully open value chain. This essay discusses also the particular impacts on economics, sociology and governance, with a philosophical conclusion.   
He is also the founder of Business2Any, a company specialized in the conception & edition of cybernetic software, related to Distributed Artificial Intelligence (DAI), machine learning & cognitive computing for the Internet of Things.

He has a long former experience as a chief information officer which, among other things, allowed him to be the first to implement all EPCglobal standardized technologies in Europe including RFID/UHF/GEN2, EPCIS and an independent ONS root (Object Naming Service) in an innovative pilot and at an operational level. The purpose was to manage, in a semi-open loop, the traceability of pallets amongst various logistics players in the supply chain.

He received for his works: 
 the “GS1 France 2005” price of innovation
 the SME Award 2006 (Le Monde Informatique)
 two trophies for "CIO 2007" (01 Informatique): "Winner SMEs" and "Jury Special Prize”.

Last, he is a founding member of the SEI (Société européenne de l'Internet/IES France]), regularly write articles, give conferences and act as a consultant for many companies.

References

External links
 Blog: https://www.i-o-t.org
 Press review: https://www.i-o-t.org/p/revue-de-presse-press-review.html
 Regular chronicles : http://www.atelier.net/authors/philippe-gautier
 Quotations on the ies-France website: http://www.ies-france.eu/projet/search/gautier/
 Interview: 3 questions to Philippe Gautier : http://www.i-o-t.org/post/3questionstoPhilippeGAUTIERbyDavidFayon
 Twitter : @neuzemayo

1967 births
French computer scientists
Living people
French businesspeople
Chief information officers